Zorach v. Clauson, 343 U.S. 306 (1952), was a case in which the Supreme Court of the United States allowed a school district to allow students to leave school for part of the day to receive religious instruction.

Case
New York State law permitted schools to allow some students to leave school during school hours for purposes of religious instruction or practice while requiring others to stay in school. Accordingly, students in New York City were allowed to leave only on written request of their guardians but the schools did not fund or otherwise assist in the development of these programs. The Greater New York Coordinating Committee on Released Time of Jews, Protestants and Roman Catholics shared their attendance with New York City Department of Education to prevent students from truancy, however. Several parents sued the district for providing official sanction for religious instruction.

Decision
The Supreme Court upheld the arrangement by finding that it did not violate the Establishment Clause of the First Amendment or the Equal Protection Clause of the Fourteenth Amendment because the instruction was not held within the school building and received no public funds.  William O. Douglas, writing for the majority, reasoned that "this 'released time' program involves neither religious instruction in public school classrooms nor the expenditure of public funds.... The case is therefore unlike McCollum v. Board of Education."

Three Justices dissented from the decision; Hugo Black, Felix Frankfurter and Robert H. Jackson considered the law unconstitutional. All three cited McCollum v. Board of Education (1948) and believed that the Court did not adequately distinguish between the circumstances in McCollum and the ones in Zorach. Jackson's dissent was especially strong: "Today's judgment will be more interesting to students of psychology and of the judicial processes than to students of constitutional law."

See also
 List of United States Supreme Court cases, volume 343

References

Further reading

External links
 

United States Supreme Court cases
United States education case law
1952 in United States case law
1952 in education
New York City Department of Education
Establishment Clause case law
Religion and education
United States lawsuits
United States equal protection case law
United States Supreme Court cases of the Vinson Court
City of New York litigation